Boys Latin School may refer to:

Boys' Latin School of Maryland
Boys' Latin of Philadelphia Charter School